Moraxella lacunata is a rod-shaped, Gram-negative, nonmotile bacterium, generally present as diploid pairs. It causes one of the commonest forms of catarrhal conjunctivitis.

History
Moraxella lacunata was first described independently by Victor Morax (1896) and Theodor Axenfeld (1897), hence the alternate name "Morax-Axenfeld diplobacilli" and the name of eye infection in humans is sometimes called Morax-Axenfeld conjunctivitis.

Characters
It has the ability to change its morphology in laboratory.  M. lacunata became shorter and tended to lose its Gram-negative staining characteristic when left out for 5 days. It also tended to retain these new characteristics on subsequent blood-agar transfers.

Clinical significance
Infection occurs mainly in adults, but can occur at any age. It is characterized by:
 Chronic, mild angular blepharoconjunctivitis frequently localized on the lid at the outer canthus
 Typical erythema of the edges of the lids
 Slight maceration of the skin, most marked at the angles, especially the outer canthus
 Superficial infiltration of the cornea is not uncommon.
 The discharge is grayish yellow, adherent to the lashes, and accumulates mainly at the angles.

References

External links
Type strain of Moraxella lacunata at BacDive -  the Bacterial Diversity Metadatabase

Gram-negative bacteria
Moraxellaceae